Curtis Obeng (born 14 February 1989) is an English professional footballer who plays as a right-back for United of Manchester. He previously played for Manchester City, Wrexham, Swansea City, Fleetwood Town, York City, Stevenage, Newport County, Macclesfield Town, Altrincham, Solihull Moors, Nuneaton Borough and Macclesfield F.C.

Early and personal life
Obeng was born in Stretford, Greater Manchester. He is of Ghanaian descent.

Club career

Early career
Obeng began his career with Manchester City's youth system, and played in the team that lost to Liverpool in the 2006 FA Youth Cup Final. He signed a two-year professional contract with City in 2007 but was released at the end of the 2008–09 season. After a trial with Premier League club Wigan Athletic, he signed a two-year contract with Conference Premier club Wrexham on 1 August 2009. In June 2011, he extended his contract for another 18 months.

Swansea City

Obeng moved to Premier League club Swansea City on 31 January 2012 on a three-and-a-half-year contract for a fee in the region of £200,000. He then was sent on loan to League Two club Fleetwood Town on 25 October 2012 for two months. He made his debut on 27 October 2012, starting in a 0–0 away draw against Rochdale. Obeng made six appearances for Fleetwood.

Obeng signed for League Two club York City on 30 January 2013 on a one-month loan, making his debut on 2 February after starting the team's 4–1 defeat at home to Morecambe. He made four appearances for York.

On 18 February 2014, Obeng signed for League One club Stevenage on loan until the end of the season.

On 23 October 2014, Obeng moved to Newport County on an initial one-month loan with was subsequently extended to 23 December. He made his debut for Newport in a 1–1 draw with Accrington Stanley on 25 October 2014. Obeng returned to Swansea on 17 December 2014 having made six appearances for Newport.

On 28 May 2015, Obeng was released by Swansea.

Later career
Obeng signed for National League club Macclesfield Town on 27 October 2016, leaving for National League North club Altrincham on 4 November. On 22 November 2016, he signed for National League club Solihull Moors. Having made five appearances, he left Solihull on 20 January 2017. He retired from football in July 2017.

Obeng came out of retirement on 22 June 2018 to sign for National League North club Nuneaton Borough. On 31 August 2019, Obeng joined Ashton United on an initial month-long deal. He also had a loan spell in February 2020 at Grantham Town, before he left Nuneaton on a permanent basis during the summer of 2020, and signed for Radcliffe.

International career
Obeng made his debut for the England national under-19 team against Croatia on 5 February 2008. He was capped four times by the under-19 team in 2008. Obeng played once for England C, as an 81st-substitute minute in a 2–1 away win over the Republic of Ireland under-23 on 26 May 2010 in the 2009–11 International Challenge Trophy.

Career statistics

References

External links

Curtis Obeng at the Nuneaton Borough F.C. website

1989 births
Living people
People from Stretford
Footballers from Greater Manchester
English footballers
England youth international footballers
England semi-pro international footballers
Association football defenders
Manchester City F.C. players
Wrexham A.F.C. players
Swansea City A.F.C. players
Fleetwood Town F.C. players
York City F.C. players
Stevenage F.C. players
Newport County A.F.C. players
Macclesfield Town F.C. players
Altrincham F.C. players
Solihull Moors F.C. players
Nuneaton Borough F.C. players
Ashton United F.C. players
Grantham Town F.C. players
Radcliffe F.C. players
National League (English football) players
English Football League players
Black British sportspeople
English people of Ghanaian descent
Macclesfield F.C. players
F.C. United of Manchester players
North West Counties Football League players